Christ Church War Memorial Garden is a garden in Oxford, England, created in 1926 to commemorate the First World War.

The war memorial garden, in memory of members of Christ Church, Oxford, one of the Oxford colleges, is located east off St Aldate's at the western end of Broad Walk, which leads along the northern edge of Christ Church Meadows. To the north is Christ Church with a view of Tom Tower above its main entrance, also on St Aldate's.

There is an inscription in the paving of the path through the garden with a quotation from John Bunyan’s Pilgrim’s Progress.

Post Second World War development planned for central Oxford included a relief road passing through the northern edge of Christ Church Meadow along the route of Broad Walk and joining the district of St Ebbe's, via the location of the garden. The proposal was defeated after vigorous opposition.

See also
 War memorial
Oxford Spanish Civil War memorial

References

External links
 

1926 establishments in England
Parks and open spaces in Oxford
War Memorial Garden
War Memorial Garden

Gardens in Oxfordshire
Monuments and memorials in Oxfordshire
United Kingdom in World War I
World War I memorials in the United Kingdom